Audium may refer to:
An American voice over Internet Protocol company acquired by Cisco Systems.
 Audium (theater)
 Audium Records, the former name of MNRK Music Group